The EG Awards of 2008 are the third and Annual The Age EG (Entertainment Guide) Awards and took place at the Prince of Wales on 4 December 2008.

Hall of Fame inductees
Died Pretty

Performers
Died Pretty
Little Red the EG Allstars
Dave Faulkner
Mark Seymour 
Katy Steele

Award nominees and winners
Winners are unknown, some nominatees are below.

References

2008 in Australian music
2008 music awards
Music Victoria Awards